Pine Crest can refer to:
 Pine Crest, Tennessee
 Pinecrest, Florida
 Pine Crest School